Madden Falls is a tiered horsetail waterfall located in the Pacific Ranges of British Columbia, Canada.

Structure
Madden Falls forms as Madden Creek emerges from the northeastern flank of Pelion Mountain and cascades down an especially steep section of the mountain in nine steps.

Most of the falls are easily observable from across the Squamish Valley.

See also
James Bruce Falls
List of waterfalls of British Columbia

References

External links

Video of Madden Falls, June 2016

Pacific Ranges
Waterfalls of British Columbia
New Westminster Land District